Jalal Daoudi (born 17 August 1988) is a Moroccan footballer who currently plays as a midfielder for Wydad AC.

Daoudi previously captained Hassania Agadir. He also played in Saudi Arabia with Al-Raed.

Daoudi was a key figure in Wydad's midfield as the club won the 2021–22 CAF Champions League.

Honours

Wydad AC 

 Botola: 2021–22

 CAF Champions League: 2021–22

References

External links
 

1988 births
Living people
Moroccan footballers
Moroccan expatriate footballers
Olympic Club de Safi players
Difaâ Hassani El Jadidi players
Fath Union Sport players
Hassania Agadir players
Al-Raed FC players
AS FAR (football) players
Botola players
Saudi Professional League players
Expatriate footballers in Saudi Arabia
Moroccan expatriate sportspeople in Saudi Arabia
Association football midfielders
People from Agadir